The CLMV countries are Cambodia, Laos, Myanmar, and Vietnam. This country association within the Association of Southeast Asian Nations (ASEAN) comprises its newest, lowest income, and formerly closed-economy members. One of the ways in which the association operates is through CLMV Economic Ministers' Meetings.

References 

Southeast Asia